Dalsjöfors GoIF is a football club in Dalsjöfors, Sweden. They play in the highest level of women's soccer leagues in Sweden, the Damallsvenskan.

Dalsjöfors GoIF play their home games at Borås Arena Stadium in Borås, also home of IF Elfsborg of the men's Premier Division (Allsvenskan).

2011 squad

References

External links
 Official website 

 
Dalsjöfors GoIF
1980 establishments in Sweden
Defunct football clubs in Sweden
Association football clubs established in 1980
Football clubs in Västra Götaland County